Poland competed at the Beijing 2008 Summer Olympics. The country's delegation included 268 athletes.

Natalia Partyka, in table tennis, is one of only two athletes competing at both the Beijing Olympics and the Beijing Paralympics - the other being South Africa's Natalie du Toit in swimming.

Medalists

Archery

Men

Women

Athletics

Men
Track & road events

Field events

Women
Track & road events

Field events

Combined events – Heptathlon

* The athlete who finished in second place, Lyudmila Blonska of the Ukraine, tested positive for a banned substance. Both the A and the B tests were positive, therefore Blonska was stripped of her silver medal, and both Polish heptathletes moved up a position.

Badminton

Boxing

Canoeing

Slalom

Sprint
Men

Women

Qualification Legend: QS = Qualify to semi-final; QF = Qualify directly to final

Cycling

Road

Track
Sprint

Keirin

Points race

Mountain biking

Equestrian

Dressage

Eventing

Fencing

Men

Women

Gymnastics

Artistic
Men

Women

Rhythmic

Handball

Men's tournament

Roster

Group play

Quarterfinal

Classification semifinal

5th–6th place

Judo

Men

Women

Modern pentathlon

Rowing

Men

Women

Qualification Legend: FA=Final A (medal); FB=Final B (non-medal); FC=Final C (non-medal); FD=Final D (non-medal); FE=Final E (non-medal); FF=Final F (non-medal); SA/B=Semifinals A/B; SC/D=Semifinals C/D; SE/F=Semifinals E/F; QF=Quarterfinals; R=Repechage

Sailing

Men

Women

Open

M = Medal race; EL = Eliminated – did not advance into the medal race; CAN = Race cancelled

Shooting

Men

Women

Swimming

Men

Women

Table tennis

Singles

Team

Tennis

Triathlon

Volleyball

Indoor
Poland entered a team in both the men's and the women's tournament. The men's team won four out of five matches in the group play, finishing third in the group, and advancing to the quarterfinals, where they lost over five sets to Italy. Their final ranking was tied for 5th place. The women's team managed to win only one match in the group play, finishing fifth in the group, and failing to advance further in the tournament. Their final ranking was tied for 9th place.

Men's tournament

Roster

Group play

Quarterfinal

Women's tournament

Roster

Group play

Weightlifting

Men

Women

Wrestling

Men's freestyle

Men's Greco-Roman

Women's freestyle

See also
 Poland at the 2008 Summer Paralympics

References

External links
Polish delegation at the 2008 Summer Olympics (pdf)

Nations at the 2008 Summer Olympics
2008
Summer Olympics